I Serve a Savior is the seventh studio album by American country music artist Josh Turner. It was released on October 26, 2018, through MCA Nashville, and is Turner's first release to primarily consist of gospel music. The album was also bundled with a live performance DVD for release exclusively in Cracker Barrel stores that features an interview with Bill Gaither.

Content
I Serve a Savior is a collection of mostly gospel music standards with a few original songs, such as the title track, which was co-written by Turner, and one that his wife and son wrote together. The album features new live recordings of two of his previous hit singles — "Long Black Train" and "Me and God" — as well as duets with Sonya Isaacs, Bobby Osborne, and Turner's own family (including his wife and four sons) on "The River (Of Happiness)".

Recording a gospel project was something Turner had "been wanting to do for a long time" and he decided that the timing was finally right for him to do it: "I didn't have any big plans for 2018 and my favorite part of my job is to go into the studio and create. I just felt like it was God's timing and I couldn't pass it up."

Critical reception
Stephen Thomas Erlewine of AllMusic gave the album three stars out of five, praising the duets with Sonya Isaacs and Bobby Osborne and calling it a "a sturdy, comforting listen, which is precisely what it was intended to be."

Commercial performance
The album debuted at No. 2 on Billboard's Top Country Albums and Top Christian Albums for charts dated November 10, 2018, selling 14,000 copies in the first week (15,000 in equivalent album units).  It is Turner's first appearance on the Christian chart. The album sold a further 8,300 copies the second week. It has sold 147,000 copies in the United States as of March 2020.

Track listing

Personnel
Adapted from AllMusic

Perry Coleman - background vocals
David Dorn - keyboards
Glen Duncan - fiddle
Kenny Greenberg - acoustic guitar, baritone guitar, electric guitar
Vicki Hampton - background vocals
Tania Hancheroff - background vocals
Matthew Holt - piano
Evan Hutchings - drums
Rob Ickes - dobro, lap steel guitar
Sonya Isaacs - duet vocals on "How Great Thou Art"
Mark Ivey - background vocals
Mike Johnson - pedal steel guitar
Trey Keller - background vocals
Jared Manzo - bass guitar, upright bass
Gale Mayes - background vocals
Carl Miner - banjo, acoustic guitar, mandolin
Gordon Mote - keyboards, organ, piano
Bobby Osborne - duet vocals on "I Pray My Way Out of Trouble"
Angela Primm - background vocals
Colby Turner - vocals on "The River (Of Happiness)"
Hampton Turner - mandolin and vocals on "The River (Of Happiness)"
Hawke Turner - vocals on "The River (Of Happiness)"
Jennifer Turner - piano and vocals on "The River (Of Happiness)"
Josh Turner - acoustic guitar, lead vocals
Marion Turner - vocals on "The River (Of Happiness)"
Glenn Worf - bass guitar, upright bass

Charts

Weekly charts

Year-end charts

References

2018 albums
Josh Turner albums
MCA Records albums
Albums produced by Kenny Greenberg